Pseudopogonatherum is a genus of Asian and Australian plants in the grass family .

 Species
 Pseudopogonatherum contortum (Brongn.) A.Camus - China, Indian Subcontinent, Southeast Asia
 Pseudopogonatherum filifolium (S.L.Chen) H.Yu, Y.F.Deng & N.X.Zhao - Anhui
 Pseudopogonatherum irritans (R.Br.) A.Camus - Myanmar, Thailand, Philippines, New Guinea, Australia
 Pseudopogonatherum quadrinerve (Hack.) Ohwi - Japan, Korea, China, Himalayas, Indochina, Malaysia, Indonesia
 Pseudopogonatherum speciosum (Debeaux) Ohwi - Japan, Korea, China, Himalayas, Indochina, Malaysia, Philippines
 Pseudopogonatherum trispicatum (Schult.) Ohwi - Yunnan, Indian Subcontinent, Southeast Asia, New Guinea, Australia

References

Andropogoneae
Poaceae genera
Taxa named by Aimée Antoinette Camus